The Pennsylvanian Allegheny Formation is a mapped bedrock unit in western and central Pennsylvania, western Maryland and West Virginia, and southeastern Ohio. It is a major coal-bearing unit in the Appalachian Plateau of the eastern United States and fossils of fishes such as Bandringa are known from the Kittaning Formation, which is part of the Allegheny Group.

Description
In Pennsylvania, the Allegheny Formation includes rocks from the base of the Brooksville Coal to the top of the Upper Freeport Coal, and was defined to include all economically significant coals in the upper Pennsylvanian sequence. The formation consists of cyclothemic sequences of coal, shale, limestone, sandstone, and clay.  It contains six major coal zones, which, in stratigraphic order, are:
 Upper Freeport Coal
 Lower Freeport Coal
 Upper Kittanning Coal
 Middle Kittanning Coal
 Lower Kittanning Coal
 Brookville Coal

Members
Glen Richey (PA), Laurel Run (PA), Mineral Springs (PA), Millstone Run (PA), Clearfield Creek (PA); Clarion (OH, MD, PA, WV), Kittanning (PA), Freeport (PA, MD, OH, WV); Putnam Hill (OH, PA); Vanport (PA, MD, OH, WV); Butler (MD, PA), Worthington (MD, PA); Washingtonville (OH, PA, WV), Columbiana (OH)

Age 
Relative age dating of the Allegheny places it in the middle Pennsylvanian period.

See also 
 Geology of Pennsylvania
 Geology of West Virginia

References 

Pennsylvanian Series
Carboniferous geology of Pennsylvania
Carboniferous geology of Rhode Island
Carboniferous Maryland
Carboniferous West Virginia
Sandstone formations of the United States
Shale formations of the United States
Coal formations
Coal in the United States
Geologic formations of Indiana
Geologic formations of Maryland
Geologic formations of Ohio
Geologic formations of Pennsylvania
Geologic formations of Rhode Island
Geologic formations of Virginia
Geologic formations of West Virginia
Carboniferous geology of Virginia
Carboniferous southern paleotropical deposits